Fernando Ariel Vega (born 7 May 1995) is an Argentine professional footballer who plays as a midfielder for Ferrocarril Midland.

Career
Vega's career started with Almirante Brown. He featured in Primera B Metropolitana fixtures with Defensores de Belgrano and Villa San Carlos in 2015, though didn't play in the subsequent 2016 season. Vega appeared in nine matches in each of the following 2016–17 and 2017–18 campaigns. In January 2020, after zero appearances in 2019–20, Vega moved to Primera C Metropolitana with Ferrocarril Midland.

Career statistics
.

References

External links

1995 births
Living people
Place of birth missing (living people)
Argentine footballers
Association football midfielders
Primera B Metropolitana players
Primera C Metropolitana players
Club Almirante Brown footballers
Club Ferrocarril Midland players